Halidzor is a village in the Tatev Municipality of the Syunik Province in Armenia.

Demographics

Population 
The Statistical Committee of Armenia reported its population was 707 in 2010, up from 602 at the 2001 census.

Features 
The village hosts a station of the Wings of Tatev - the world's longest non-stop double track aerial tramway.

Gallery

References 

Populated places in Syunik Province
Communities in Syunik Province